Wendl is a German surname. Notable people with the surname include:

Annemarie Wendl, German actress
Hans Wendl, German record producer
Ingrid Wendl, Austrian figure skater
Michael J. Wendl, American engineer
Tobias Wendl (born 1987), German Rennrodler

See also
Wendl & Lung, a piano-manufacturing company based in Vienna
Wendel (name), given name and surname

German-language surnames